Dalophia angolensis is a species of amphisbaenian in the family Amphisbaenidae. The species is native to southern Africa.

Geographic range
D. angolensis is found in Angola and Zambia.

References

Dalophia
Reptiles described in 1976
Taxa named by Carl Gans